Blackburner is an American electronic music duo. Blackburner combines elements of dubstep, metal, and electronica. A buzz started for Blackburner by remixing tracks and releasing original compositions through Cleopatra Records, initially placing Blackburner alongside dubstep artists such as Rusko, Nero and Dubba Jonny.

Blackburner’s debut album, Feel the Burn, featured guest appearances by Edgar Froese of Tangerine Dream, as well as John Wesley of Porcupine Tree. The single "Freak You" was used on a national Verizon FIOS Quantum advertisement, and on NBC’s hit competition program America's Got Talent.

In the summer of 2012, Blackburner was asked to support industrial group Ministry on their AEG (Anschutz Entertainment Group) American tour. They also appeared at SXSW 2012. During this time, Blackburner met William Shatner briefly, inspiring Skyla to write a sci-fi driven album, Planet Earth Attack.

2017 Release new album Dog Eats Rabbit (with rapper DMX)

Studio albums

Compilation albums

Singles

Remixes

Appears on

"Freak You" was featured in America's Got Talent the Las Vegas Round 2012 Episode 13. "Freak You" was featured in Verizon FIOS national ad campaign for Verizon Fios Quantum.

Chart history
Drop Bombs Not Bass (Beatport) placed Number 1 on in the Dubstep Charts (December 6, 2012).

Band Equity placed them as the number 1 Dubstep artist on ReverbNation.com

References

External links
Official Website
Revolver Magazine Concert Review of Blackburner
Sonic Seducer Blackburner - Feel the Burn album review 
Interview Blackburner 07 MAY 2012 
Interview with Blackburner’s Skyla Talon 
Blackburner open's for Ministry 

Electronic music groups from California
Musical groups from Los Angeles
Hypnotic Records artists